"I'm going to Disney World!" and "I'm going to Disneyland!" are advertising slogans used in a series of television commercials by The Walt Disney Company that began airing in 1987. Used to promote the company's theme park resorts in Florida and California, the commercials most often are broadcast following the Super Bowl and typically feature an NFL player (usually the Super Bowl MVP) shouting the phrase while celebrating the team's victory immediately after the championship game. These commercials have also promoted champions from other sports, and winners of non-sport competitions such as American Idol.

Format
Disney refers to the campaign as "What's Next?" in reference to the commercial's usual format, which has the star appear to be answering a question posed by an unseen narrator—"What are you going to do next?"—after his or her moment of triumph. The narrator is Mark Champion, a veteran radio play-by-play announcer for the Tampa Bay Buccaneers, Detroit Lions, Detroit Pistons, and Westwood One. Most ads feature the song "When You Wish Upon a Star" and end with a shot of fireworks over Cinderella Castle or Sleeping Beauty Castle.

Typically the star records two versions of the commercial, one for each phrase, so that the ads can be broadcast in different American media markets to strategically promote either the Walt Disney World Resort in Florida or the Disneyland Resort in California. In most cases, Disney arranges for its star to appear in a parade at either Disneyland or one of the Walt Disney World theme parks the day immediately following the victory in order to fulfill the spoken promise in one version.

History

Original campaign
In his 1998 memoir Work in Progress, Disney CEO Michael Eisner credited his wife, Jane, with the idea for the campaign. According to Eisner, during the January 1987 grand opening for the Star Tours attraction at Disneyland, the couple dined with Dick Rutan and Jeana Yeager, who in December 1986 had piloted the first aircraft to fly around the world without stopping or refueling. After Jane Eisner asked what the pilots planned to do next, they replied, "Well, we're going to Disneyland." She later told her husband the phrase would make a great advertising campaign.

Following Super Bowl XXI on January 25, 1987, a Disney commercial starred New York Giants quarterback Phil Simms, in which he was asked "Now that you've won the Super Bowl, Phil Simms, what are you going to do?" Simms, who replied "I'm going to Disney World", was paid $75,000; John Elway was paid the same amount, in case the Denver Broncos won. The company later aired three more ads that year with other athletes following major sports championships.

While appearing in a subsequent parade at the Walt Disney World Resort, 1994 Winter Olympics figure skater Nancy Kerrigan was recorded saying to Mickey Mouse, "This is dumb. I hate it. This is the most corniest thing I have ever done." Kerrigan, however, claimed that her remarks had been misinterpreted. She claimed that while participating in the parade was not corny, wearing her Silver Medal was because her parents had taught her not to boast or flaunt her accomplishments. Kerrigan also went on to say that she had nothing against the Disney Company or Mickey Mouse and said, "Whoever could find fault with Mickey Mouse? He's the greatest mouse I've ever known."

Ray Lewis was named Super Bowl XXXV MVP, but because of a murder trial he was involved in the previous year, the phrase "I'm going to Disney World!" was given instead to quarterback Trent Dilfer.

In subsequent years, Disney reportedly has offered $30,000 to athletes and other stars for participating in the ads and appearing at one of its theme parks.

Although Tom Brady was named MVP of Super Bowl LI, he gave the Disney trip to teammate James White.

2006 return
In 2006, the campaign resumed before Super Bowl XL as Disney projected scenes from the 20-year history of the campaign onto a Detroit skyscraper in the days before the game. During the television broadcast, Disney aired a commercial showing members of the Pittsburgh Steelers and Seattle Seahawks practicing how they would deliver the famous phrase while preparing for the game. The following day, the company began airing a traditional "What's Next" commercial featuring Steelers Hines Ward and Jerome Bettis. Even though it was not part of the ad buy in 2016, Peyton Manning said the famous phrase in an interview after Super Bowl 50.

2020 overhaul
For Super Bowl LIV in 2020, Disney Parks, Experiences and Products was the official sponsor of that game's MVP ceremony; Patrick Mahomes' announcement of the phrase was thus embedded into the broadcast post-game show, which included appearances by Mickey and Minnie Mouse alongside 10 year-old Make-a-Wish child Nathaniel from Austin, Texas. During the Disney World parade honoring Mahomes, Nathaniel also took part, representing the Make-a-Wish Foundation. Nathaniel also posed with Mahomes, Disney Parks, Experiences and Products Chairman Bob Chapek, Mickey and Minnie, NFL Commissioner Roger Goodell and Make-A-Wish America President/CEO Richard K. Davis when Chapek announced a $1 million donation to the Make-a-Wish Foundation in Mahomes' honor. 17 other children from the Make-A-Wish Foundation also got free passes to attend the parade as well.

Stars and celebrations
The commercials generally star a single NFL player immediately following the Super Bowl but the campaign also has featured athletes from other championship games and several non-celebrities.

References

The Walt Disney Company
Super Bowl commercials
American advertising slogans
Walt Disney World
Disneyland
1987 neologisms
Advertising campaigns